Adly Moto is a Taiwanese scooter manufacturer and is owned by the Her Chee Industrial Company Ltd.  Adly was founded in 1978 and initially produced motorcycles.  It now also produces scooters (petrol and electric) and quad-bikes. Her Chee Industrial Ltd has exclusive manufacturing agreement for high quality LandFighter all-terrain vehicles.

See also
 List of companies of Taiwan

Motorcycle manufacturers of Taiwan
Scooter manufacturers
Vehicle manufacturing companies established in 1978
Taiwanese brands
1978 establishments in Taiwan